Manuel Mikus (born 13 July 1999) is a Liechtensteiner footballer who currently plays for Balzers.

International career
He is a member of the Liechtenstein national football team, making his debut in a friendly match against Gibraltar on 16 November 2022. Mikus also made 13 appearances for the Liechtenstein U21.

References

1999 births
Living people
Liechtenstein footballers
Association football defenders
Liechtenstein international footballers
FC Vaduz players